Henry Thompson Crichton (18 May 1884 – 1 July 1968) was an English cricketer.  Crichton was a right-handed batsman who bowled right-arm medium pace.  He was born at Edgbaston, Warwickshire and was educated at King Edward's School, Birmingham.

Crichton made two first-class appearances for Warwickshire in the 1908 County Championship against Sussex and Hampshire.  In the match against Sussex, Crichton was dismissed for a duck in Warwickshire's first-innings by John Vincett.  In Sussex's first-innings, he took the wickets of Ernest Killick and George Cox, finishing with figures of 2/21 from six overs, with the match ending in a draw.  Against Hampshire, he was dismissed for a duck in Warwickshire's first-innings by Jack Newman, while in their second-innings he was promoted to open the batting, scoring 26 runs before he was caught by Alex Bowell off the bowling of Charlie Llewellyn.  Warwickshire won the match by 6 wickets.

He later made two appearances for Berkshire in the 1913 Minor Counties Championship against Dorset and Buckinghamshire.  He died at Branksome Park, Dorset on 1 July 1968.  His great-grandson Jim Troughton was a first-class cricketer who played for England.

References

External links

1884 births
1968 deaths
People from Edgbaston
People educated at King Edward's School, Birmingham
English cricketers
Warwickshire cricketers
Berkshire cricketers
Troughton family